This list contains an overview of the locomotives of the Grand Duchy of Baden State Railway (Großherzogliche Baden Staatsbahn), the national railway of the Grand Duchy of Baden, a sovereign state within the German Empire until 1920.

Classification scheme 

Locomotives in the Grand Duchy of Baden State Railway were organised into classes and were given a railway number as well as names. Their names were derived from the animal kingdom, geographical features (rivers, mountains and towns) as well as people.  Because the selection of names became increasingly difficult as more and more vehicles were procured, in 1868 the allocation of names was dropped from locomotive number 218 onwards.  In 1882, all name plates were removed.

Railway numbers were issued in sequence.  When locomotives were retired, their numbers were allocated to the next locomotives to be delivered. Up to 1882 the name was also adopted. In 1872 an attempt was made to organise the sequence of numbers within locomotive classes.  The numbers were swapped around, but locomotives retained the same name. Because there were limits to the practicality of this, it was given up again five years later.

From the 1880s the state railway tried again to organise the railway numbers.  Initially shunting locomotives began to be allocated numbers starting at 500.  As this threshold was soon reached by the normal vehicle fleet, locomotives were given numbers in the 600s and later in the 1000s.

Unlike other railways, class designations were included from the start. For each new design, a new class number was issued. As a result, classes I to XIV had emerged by 1868.

In 1868 a new system was introduced. This entailed engines with the same features or requirements being grouped together.

 
The locomotives previously organised under the old scheme were transferred into the new classes. In order to improve clarity, the old class designations are shown in italics.

 
Using the additional lower case letters "a" to "h", the various sub-types within a class were distinguished. In addition, each delivery batch was indicated with a superscript.

Thus the VI b10 is the tenth batch of Class VI b passenger train tank locomotives.

Steam Locomotives 

The class designations used before 1868 are shown in italics in the following tables for greater clarity.

Early Broad Gauge Locomotives for All Traffic Types 

None of the locomotives were reclassified with Deutsche Reichsbahn running numbers.

Passenger and express train locomotives

Goods train locomotives

Tank locomotives

Narrow gauge locomotives 

Baden narrow gauge locomotives were built for metre gauge.

Electric locomotives 

Baden's electric locomotives were for the Wiesental and Wehratal railways, electrified on 13 September 1913.

Railcars 

Baden railcars were included in the register of passenger coaches and luggage vans, that were also grouped into classes.

See also 
 Grand Duchy of Baden
 Grand Duchy of Baden State Railway
 UIC classification

References 
 Wolfgang Valtin: Deutsches Lok-Archiv: Verzeichnis aller Lokomotiven und Triebwagen Band 1 – Nummerierungssysteme, Transpress, Berlin 1992, 
 Wolfgang Valtin: Deutsches Lok-Archiv: Verzeichnis aller Lokomotiven und Triebwagen Band 2 – Dampflokomotiven und Dampftriebwagen, Transpress, Berlin 1992, 
 Wolfgang Valtin: Deutsches Lok-Archiv: Verzeichnis aller Lokomotiven und Triebwagen Band 3 – Elektro- und Dieselloks, Triebwagen, Transpress, Berlin 1992, 
 Hermann Lohr, Georg Thielmann: Lokomotiv-Archiv Baden, Transpress, Berlin 1988, 
 Albert Mühl: Die Großherzoglich Badischen Staatseisenbahnen, Franckh, Stuttgart 1981,

External links 
 There is an English-language discussion forum at Railways of Germany

Defunct railway companies of Germany
Locomotives of Germany

Deutsche Reichsbahn-Gesellschaft locomotives
Locomotives and railbuses
Railway locomotive-related lists
German railway-related lists
Locomotives and railbuses